The second season of Pilipinas Got Talent premiered on ABS-CBN on February 26, 2011. International artist Billy Crawford and Luis Manzano of Komiks Presents: Flash Bomba take role as the hosts of the show. Once again, the judges include former ABS-CBN executive Freddie M. Garcia, Kris Aquino, and Ai-Ai de las Alas. Auditions for this season were then held in several key cities in the Philippines including Dagupan, Batangas, Naga, Cebu, Davao, and Manila. The show ended last June 26, 2011.

Auditions

The auditions for the second season takes place in key cities in the Philippines. Major auditions are held in Cebu, Davao, Naga, Batangas, Dagupan and Metro Manila where the hopefuls are judged by Kris Aquino, Ai-Ai de las Alas and Freddie "FMG" Garcia. Also, micro-auditions are also held in other cities including Laoag, Tuguegarao, Baguio, Nueva Ecija, Olongapo, Pampanga, Laguna, Lucena, Legazpi City, Roxas City, Bacolod, Cagayan de Oro, and General Santos and judged by the staff of Pilipinas Got Talent.

Judges Cull
After the nationwide auditions, 174 acts made it to the Judges Cull where the judges select the top 36 semi-finalists. The Judges Cull for Luzon and Visayas auditions were held at Dolphy Theater in ABS-CBN where 26 acts made it to the semi-finals. On the other hand, the remaining 10 acts from Mindanao were personally visited by the judges in their hometown to inform the news that they are qualified for the semi-finals.

Top 36 Results Summary
Color Key

{{plainlist|*  Winner
  Runner-up

 Only one half of the Bourbon Duo appeared on stage; the other half was injured during rehearsals.
 The Kapidamu Band was among the previous season's second group of semi-finalists, taking third place; they lost the Judges' Choice vote to Markki Stroem . The rule that allowed auditioners from previous seasons to reaudition seemingly extends to include unsuccessful semi-finalists and those who did not pass the Judges' Cull in their seasons, thus paving the way for the band's return to the semi-finals this season.

Live shows

Semi-finals
The semi-finals was held in PAGCOR Grand Theater in Casino Filipino, Parañaque City where the 36 acts competed in six weeks for the twelve slots in the Finals. Every week, two acts will make it to the Finals through public vote and judges' vote.

Color key

Week 1 (April 30 & May 1)

Week 2 (May 7 & 8)

Week 3 (May 14 & 15)

Week 4 (May 21 & 22)

Week 5 (May 28 & 29)

Week 6 (June 4 & 5)

Wild Card Round
While this season's semi-final went through the same procedure are the previous season, this season introduced the wild card round in which the judges' vote losers in the first six rounds were given a second chance to compete for two more spots in the Finals. Finalists selected from the wild card round would entirely be determined by public vote; this section only covers buzz-outs since the judges' observations and comments would not largely affect the outcome of the voting. Voting procedure is slightly different is this round; in the results night, the top 3 compete in a second round of performances and voting from which the top two would advance to the Finals.

The wild card round was announced near the end of the sixth semi-finals round and was held on June 11 and 12, 2011. This was also the first time in the entire Got Talent franchise that wild card competitors were given a chance to have spots in the finale.

Color Key:

Round 1 (June 11) 

The top 3 got 25.54%, 22.31%, and 21.33% of the Round 1 vote respectively. However, which act got what percentage was never revealed as they were called out "in no particular order."

Round 2 (June 12) 
{| class="wikitable" style="text-align:center; width:100%;" data-ve-attributes="{"style":"text-align:center; width:100%;"}"
! rowspan="2" style="width:25%;" data-ve-attributes="{"style":"width:25%;"}" |Contestant
! rowspan="2" style="width:03%;" data-ve-attributes="{"style":"width:03%;"}" |Semifinal Week
! rowspan="2" href="La Union" |Act
! colspan="3" style="width:20%;" data-ve-attributes="{"style":"width:20%;"}" |Buzzes
! rowspan="2" style="width:10%;" data-ve-attributes="{"style":"width:10%;"}" |Percentage
! rowspan="2" style="width:10%;" data-ve-attributes="{"style":"width:10%;"}" href="Malolos" |Result
|- href="Bulacan"
! style="width:06.66%;" data-ve-attributes="{"style":"width:06.66%;"}" |FMG
! style="width:06.66%;" data-ve-attributes="{"style":"width:06.66%;"}" |Kris
! style="width:06.66%;" data-ve-attributes="{"style":"width:06.66%;"}" href="Surigao del Norte" |Ai-ai
|- bgcolor="silver"
| scope="row" style="text-align:left;" data-ve-attributes="{"style":"text-align:left;"}" |Joy's Divas
|6
| scope="row" style="text-align:left;" data-ve-attributes="{"style":"text-align:left;"}" href="Butuan" |Singing trio
|
|
|
| data-ve-attributes="{"style":"width:100%; text-align:center;"}" |28.15%
|Eliminated
|- bgcolor="gold"
| scope="row" style="text-align:left;" data-ve-attributes="{"style":"text-align:left;"}" |Skeights
|2
| scope="row" style="text-align:left;" data-ve-attributes="{"style":"text-align:left;"}" |Band
|
| href="Bukidnon" |
|
|30.16%
|Advanced
|- bgcolor="gold"
| scope="row" style="text-align:left;" data-ve-attributes="{"style":"text-align:left;"}" href="University of Batangas" |{{nowrap|Rico the Magician (Romarico Sanorjo)}}
|1
| scope="row" style="text-align:left;" data-ve-attributes="{"style":"text-align:left;"}" href="Batangas City" |Magician
|
|
|41.68%Advanced
|}

Finals
The Finals was held at the Araneta Coliseum on June 25–26, 2011. Twelve acts from the Semi-Finals round and Wild Card winners performed again to win the title of the second Pilipinas Got Talent winner. A week before the Finals, two special episodes called "The Road to the Finals" was aired, profiling the fourteen Finalists. For the performance night, Nikki Gil took co-hosting duties from Luis Manzano, who was having another commitment at the time.

Another change for the Finals was the limits in public voting. A user of one SIM card number or e-mail address could only give up to 30 or 32 votes (depending on the method of voting) to a single act per day to ensure fairness.

 Performances 

National RatingsPilipinas Got Talent Season 2'' hits all-time high 38.2% national rating. 
The National Ratings came from the whole-wide Philippine coverage of TV audience ratings from Kantar Media Philippines.

References

Pilipinas Got Talent
2011 Philippine television seasons